Masire may refer to the following people
Given name
Masire Kamara, Sierra Leone celebrity and tea seller

Surname
Gladys Olebile Masire (1932–2013), teacher and political figure from Botswana, wife of Quett Masire 
Quett Masire (1925–2017), second President of Botswana 
Tebogo Masire, commander of the Botswana Defence Force 

Bantu-language surnames